William Cousins, Jr. (October 29, 1927 – January 20, 2018) was an American lawyer, judge, and member of the Chicago City Council.

Early life
Cousins was born in Swiftown, Mississippi, and was an African-American. He moved with his family to Memphis, Tennessee. Cousins and his family then moved to Chicago, Illinois. He graduated from DuSable High School in Chicago, in 1945. Cousins received his bachelor's degree in political science, from University of Illinois in 1948 and his law degree from Harvard Law School in 1951. He served in the United States Army during World War II and was a commissioned a lieutenant colonel. He practiced law in Chicago and served as a Cook County assistant state's attorney.

Chicago City Council
Cousins was a Republican, but left the party during the 1964 elections after the nomination of Barry Goldwater, an opponent of the Civil Rights Act of 1964 and became a Democrat. In 1967, he defeated incumbent James A. Condon. During his time on the City Council, Cousins was considered an opponent of the Democratic political machine that was led by Richard J. Daley. Cousins served on the Chicago City Council from 1967 to 1976. He was succeeded by Marian Humes, an ally of John Stroger.

Judicial career
He then served as an Illinois Circuit Court judge from 1976 to 1992. In 1979, he ruled the death penalty was unconstitutional. In 1992, he was elected to the Illinois Appellate Court and served until 2002.

Retirement and death
Cousins died at the University of Chicago Hospital in Chicago, Illinois.

Notes

1927 births
2018 deaths
People from Leflore County, Mississippi
People from Memphis, Tennessee
Lawyers from Chicago
Military personnel from Illinois
Military personnel from Mississippi
University of Illinois Urbana-Champaign alumni
Harvard Law School alumni
Chicago City Council members
Illinois state court judges
Judges of the Illinois Appellate Court
Illinois Democrats
Illinois Republicans
African-American people in Illinois politics
20th-century American judges
20th-century American lawyers
20th-century African-American people
21st-century African-American people